Lawrence (Larry) Bastedo is a Canadian motorcycle racer who was inducted into the Canadian Motorsport Hall of Fame in 2004.

Larry Bastedo has competed in almost every discipline in motorcycling. His first major win came in 1957 winning the 500 Expert class at the CMA Ontario Championship Spring Scrambles (now known as Motocross), the Eastern Canadian Championships held at Copetown, ON and the 500 Expert class National Ice Racing Championship at St-Agathe, QC.

A road racing injury led him to Enduros and he was a member and later Manager and Official with Team Canada at the FIM World Championship for Enduro National Teams (ISDE).

As a rider he was a member of the first Canadian Team to participate in the ISDE –

Poland 1967, a centennial project.  He acted as Team Manager for a few years and after obtaining his FIM Sporting Steward's licence represented the team as the Canadian delegate on the International Jury.

For many years he enjoyed a reputation as an outstanding race announcer.

He served on the Provincial and National Boards of the Canadian Motorcycle Association holding various positions – President, Vice President and Director, and also was accredited with National Referee status, officiating at CMA events for many years.

Milestones
1957  500 cc Expert National Ice Racing Champion
1970  300 cc Expert National Enduro Champion
1987  Super Veteran National Enduro Champion
1988  Super Veteran National Enduro Champion
1980  CMA Ambassadors Award
1981  CMA Award of Merit
1985  CMA Fulvio Callimaci Supporters Award
2004  Inducted into the Canadian Motorsports Hall of Fame
2011  Inducted into the Canadian Motorcycle Hall of Fame
2014  Elected to the Hamilton Sports Hall of Fame

References

Living people
Year of birth missing (living people)
Canadian motorcycle racers